The Spice of Life is a pub at Cambridge Circus in London's Charing Cross Road. The pub was founded as The George & Thirteen Cantons in or before 1759, and later became The Scots Hoose. By 1975 it had been renamed The Spice of Life.

As the Scots Hoose in the 1950s and 1960s, the pub had one of Britain's most celebrated folk clubs in its upstairs room, run by Bruce Dunnet, that featured some of the greatest names of the folk revival, such as Bert Jansch, Al Stewart, Davey Graham, Ralph McTell, Roy Harper, Sandy Denny, Ewan MacColl and The Young Tradition. The club operated under various names, including "The Young Tradition".

References

Pubs in Soho